Cockle Island Boat Club is located in Groomsport, County Down, Northern Ireland on the south shore of Belfast Lough

The club is one of the clubs on the lough that form part of the Belfast Lough Yachting Conference.

External links
 Cockleislandboatclub.com

Yacht clubs in Northern Ireland
Sports clubs in County Down